Andrei Pavel and Gabriel Trifu were the defending champions, but were forced to withdraw before their semifinal match.

Lucas Arnold Ker and Martín García won the title by defeating Marc-Kevin Goellner and Francisco Montana 6–3, 2–6, 6–3 in the final.

Seeds

Draw

Draw

References

External links
 Official results archive (ATP)
 Official results archive (ITF)

1999 Doubles
Doubles
1999 in Romanian sport